This Life can refer to:

Film and television
This Life (1996 TV series), a British television drama
This Life (2015 TV series), a Canadian television drama based on the French-language Canadian series Nouvelle adresse
This Life (film), a 2012 Danish film

Music
This Life (album), by the Original Rudeboys, 2012
"This Life" (Sons of Anarchy song), the theme song of the TV series Sons of Anarchy, 2008
"This Life" (Vampire Weekend song), 2019
"This Life", by the Afters from Life Is Beautiful
"This Life", by Bruce Springsteen from Working on a Dream
"This Life", by Denzel Curry from Imperial
"This Life", by Martha Wainwright from Martha Wainwright, 2005
"This Life", by MercyMe from The Generous Mr. Lovewell
"This Life", by Tim Hecker from Konoyo

Other 
This Life: Secular Faith and Spiritual Freedom, a 2019 book by Martin Hägglund

See also 
This Is Life, a 2012 novel by Dan Rhodes
This Is Life (film), a 1953 Danish film
This Is Life with Lisa Ling, a TV series